Nicolas Jüllich (born 27 March 1990) is a German footballer who plays for VfR Mannheim.

Career

Primarily a midfielder, Jüllich began his career with Waldhof Mannheim, where he played for two seasons in the Regionalliga before joining Bayern in July 2010. He made his 3. Liga debut in the opening match of the 2010–11 season, a 1–0 defeat against SV Babelsberg. He has played for Bayern's first-team in pre-season friendlies in 2010, most notably the Franz Beckenbauer farewell match against Real Madrid, where he played as a stand-in for Philipp Lahm at right back, and earned praise for his performance up against Cristiano Ronaldo. He was named in Bayern's squad for the 2010–11 UEFA Champions League, where he was given the number 34, and was named on the substitutes' bench for a Bundesliga match against Hannover 96 in October 2010. After two years with Bayern's reserves, he joined 1. FC Saarbrücken in summer 2012, where he spent a season before being released in 2013. He signed for SG Sonnenhof Großaspach four months later.

References

External links
 

1990 births
Sportspeople from Heidelberg
Footballers from Baden-Württemberg
Living people
German footballers
Association football midfielders
SV Waldhof Mannheim players
FC Bayern Munich II players
1. FC Saarbrücken players
SG Sonnenhof Großaspach players
FC Vaduz players
VfR Mannheim players
3. Liga players
Swiss Challenge League players
German expatriate footballers
Expatriate footballers in Liechtenstein
German expatriate sportspeople in Liechtenstein